John Morton (born September 24, 1969) is an American football coach and former player who is the Passing Game Coordinator for the Denver Broncos of the National Football League (NFL). He previously served as an Senior Offensive assistant coach for the New York Jets, New Orleans Saints, San Francisco 49ers and Las Vegas Raiders. He also served as an assistant coach at USC.

Playing career
Morton played college football at Western Michigan, where he was a wide receiver. He played wide receiver professionally for the Canadian Football League Toronto Argonauts and on the practice squads of the Oakland Raiders and Green Bay Packers.

Coaching career
After ending his playing career in 1997, Morton began working for the National Football League's Oakland Raiders, initially in the personnel department for one season. In 1998, he took a coaching position in the organization, originally as an offensive assistant working with wide receivers, and eventually was promoted to senior offensive assistant on a team that made it to Super Bowl XXXVII under head coach Bill Callahan. After another year at the position, he was elevated to Tight Ends Coach for the 2004 season under new Raiders head coach Norv Turner.

In 2005, he joined Jim Harbaugh's staff at the University of San Diego, a D-IAA college program, where he coached the passing game and wide receivers for a squad that went 11-1-0 and won the Pioneer Football League Championship. The following season, he took a position as an offensive assistant with the New Orleans Saints under head coach Sean Payton, who advanced to the 2006 NFC Championship game.

Morton joined USC in 2007, taking up a similar position to the one he held at San Diego. When offensive coordinator Steve Sarkisian accepted a head coaching position with Washington, Morton was interviewed by head coach Pete Carroll as a candidate for the position. As expected, Morton eventually got the job.
In 2017, he was hired by the New York Jets  as an offensive coordinator. On January 17, 2018, Morton was subsequently fired.
In February 2019, Morton returned to Oakland as the Senior Offensive Assistant under Jon Gruden. In 2022 he was brought to the Lions for the same position.

References

External links
 USC Trojans bio

1969 births
Living people
American football wide receivers
American players of Canadian football
Canadian football wide receivers
Frankfurt Galaxy players
Green Bay Packers players
Jacksonville Jaguars players
New Orleans Saints coaches
Las Vegas Raiders coaches
Oakland Raiders coaches
Oakland Raiders players
People from Auburn Hills, Michigan
Players of American football from Michigan
San Diego Toreros football coaches
San Francisco 49ers coaches
Toronto Argonauts players
USC Trojans football coaches
Western Michigan Broncos football players
National Football League offensive coordinators
Detroit Lions coaches